Barbery may refer to:

 Muriel Barbery (born 1969), Morocco-born French novelist and professor of philosophy
 Barbery, Calvados, France
 Barbery, Oise, France
Barbers